The Gulf of St. Lawrence is the outlet of the North American Great Lakes via the St. Lawrence River into the Atlantic Ocean.

Geography 

The Gulf of St. Lawrence is bounded on the north by the Labrador Peninsula and Quebec, to the east by Saint-Pierre and Newfoundland, to the south by the Nova Scotia peninsula and Cape Breton Island, and to the west by the Gaspé Peninsula, New Brunswick, and Quebec. As for significant islands the Gulf of Saint Lawrence contains Anticosti Island, Prince Edward Island, Îles-de-la-Madeleine, Cape Breton Island, Saint Pierre Island, and Miquelon-Langlade.

Half of the ten provinces of Canada adjoin the Gulf: New Brunswick, Nova Scotia, Prince Edward Island, Newfoundland and Labrador, and Quebec.

Besides the Saint Lawrence River itself, significant streams emptying into the Gulf of Saint Lawrence include the Miramichi River, Natashquan River, Romaine River, Restigouche River, Margaree River, and Humber River.

Branches of the Gulf include the Chaleur Bay, Fortune Bay, Miramichi Bay, St. George's Bay, Bay St. George, Bay of Islands, and Northumberland Strait.

Outlets 
The gulf flows into the Atlantic Ocean through the following outlets:

Due to the construction of the Canso Causeway across the strait in 1955, it no longer permits exchange of water between the Gulf of Saint Lawrence and the Atlantic Ocean.

Extent 

The limits of the Gulf of Saint Lawrence vary between sources.

The International Hydrographic Organization defines the limits of the Gulf of Saint Lawrence as follows:

On the Northeast.
A line running from Cape Bauld (North point of Kirpon Island) to the East extreme of Belle Isle and on to the Northeast Ledge. Thence a line joining this ledge with the East extreme of Cape St. Charles (52°13'N) in Labrador.

On the Southeast.
A line from Cape Canso to Red Point in Cape Breton Island, through this Island to Cape Breton [] and on to Pointe Blanche in the Island of St. Pierre, and thence to the Southwest point of Morgan Island.

On the West.
The meridian of 64°30'W from Pointe-Jaune to Magpie, but the whole of Anticosti Island is included in the Gulf.

Fisheries and Oceans Canada places the western limit at Pointe-des-Monts, approximately 138 km (85.8 mi) west of the 64°30'W meridian.

Protected areas and national parks
St. Paul Island in Nova Scotia off the northeastern tip of Cape Breton Island, is known as the "Graveyard of the Gulf" because of its many shipwrecks. Access to this island is controlled by the Canadian Coast Guard.

In 1919 the first Migratory Bird Sanctuaries (MBS) in Canada were established under the Migratory Birds Convention Act on Bonaventure Island, on the Bird Rocks of the Magdalen Islands, and on the Percé Rock. These migratory bird sanctuaries are administered by the Canadian Wildlife Service. 

The Federal Government of Canada manages the National Parks of Canada along the Gulf of Saint Lawrence at Forillon National Park on the eastern tip of the Gaspé Peninsula, Prince Edward Island National Park on the northern shore of the island, Kouchibouguac National Park on the northeastern coast of New Brunswick, Cape Breton Highlands National Park on the northern tip of Cape Breton Island, Gros Morne National Park on the west coast of Newfoundland, and a National Park Reserve in the Mingan Archipelago on the Côte-Nord of Quebec.

The five provinces bordering the Gulf of Saint Lawrence have several provincial parks with protected coasts.

Undersea features 

The Laurentian Channel is a feature of the floor of the Gulf that was formed during previous ice ages, when the Continental Shelf was eroded by the Saint Lawrence River during the periods when the sea level plunged. Deep waters with temperatures between  enter the Gulf at the continental slope and are slowly advected up the channel by estuariane circulation. Over the 20th century, the bottom waters of the end of the channel (i.e. in the Saint Lawrence estuary) have become hypoxic.

History 

The gulf has provided a historically important marine fishery for various First Nations that have lived on its shores for millennia and used its waters for transportation.

The first documented voyage by a European in its waters was by the French explorer Jacques Cartier in the year 1534. Cartier named the shores of the Saint Lawrence River "The Country of Canadas", after an indigenous word meaning "village" or "settlement", thus naming the world's second largest country.

Basque whalers from Saint-Jean-de-Luz sailed into the Gulf of Saint Lawrence in 1530 and began whaling at Red Bay. They established their base on the Strait of Belle Isle and worked closely with the Iroquois in the Gulf of Saint Lawrence. In 1579 the English government closed all English ports to Spanish oil imports. As a result, a third of Basque whale oil could not be sold. Basque whaling collapsed in the Gulf of Saint Lawrence and never recovered.

See also

 Anticosti Island
 Atlantic Ocean
 Estuary of St. Lawrence
 Maritime Peninsula
 St. Lawrence Seaway

References

External links

 St. Lawrence Global Observatory 
 The Gulf of St. Lawrence - A Unique Ecosystem , Department of Fisheries and Oceans
 Timing and position of late Wisconsinan ice-margins on the upper slope seaward of Laurentian Channel

Canada–Saint Pierre and Miquelon border
Estuaries of Canada
Saint Laurent
Saint Laurent